Cors Gyfelog National Nature Reserve is a wetland site near the village of Pant Glas in the community of Clynnog, Gwynedd, Wales. It is important as a habitat for the Marsh Fritillary butterfly, as well as Lesser Redpoll and Grasshopper Warbler.

References

External links

Cors Gyfelog National Nature Reserve, near Caernarfon, North Wales
Corsydd Eifionydd - Special Areas of Conservation

National nature reserves in Wales
Nature reserves in Gwynedd
Wetlands of Gwynedd